Gulebakavali Katha is a 1962 Indian Telugu-language fantasy swashbuckler film directed by N. T. Rama Rao. The film was produced by N. Trivikrama Rao on National Art Theatres banner. It is based on the folk tale Gulebakavali from the folk tale collection Arabian Nights. Rama Rao also stars alongside Jamuna and Nagarathna. The film focuses on a man's quest to search for the Gulebakavali flower, which he needs to cure the king's blindness. It was released on 5 January 1962, and became a commercial success.

Plot 

King Chandrasena has two wives, Gunavathi and Rupavathi. Rupavathi has three sons. Rupavathi's brother Vakraketu has an eye on the king's throne. When Gunavathi gets pregnant with the blessings of the goddess Parvathi, Vakraketu and Rupavathi bribe the astrologer by saying that the King loses his eyesight if he sees the child and tries to murder the infant, but he is rescued and brought up by a shepherd couple and named Vijay. Once, King Chandrasena goes hunting in the forest, sees Vijay and loses his eyesight, but the actual reason had plotted against the king and made him blind. Doctors advise the king to get the Gulebakavali flower which blossoms on the full moon day in the Yakshaloka.

Vijay sets on an adventurous journey to get the Gulebakavali flower which has healing powers and can, therefore, cure blindness. He meets a trickster dice player Yuktimati, whom he defeats and marries and saves his three elder brothers, sons of Rupavati. He then reaches Devaloka, woos princess Bakavali, gets the flower, but his brothers steal it from him. He returns to Devaloka only to find the pond dry. Vijay then offers his eyes. The pond blooms with the divine flower, an impressed Mahendra plucks it, restores Vijay's vision and gives him his daughter's hand. Vijay returns to his kingdom with his two wives, annihilates Vakrakethu and the army chief Dushtabudhi, cures his father's blindness with the divine flower saved for him by Atitelivi from his brothers and ascends the throne.

Cast 
Credits adapted from The Hindu:
 N. T. Rama Rao as Vijay
 Jamuna as Yuktimati
 Nagarathna as Bakavali
 Peketi Sivaram as one of Rupavathi's sons
 Mukkamala as Chandrasena
 Rajanala Kaleswara Rao as Vakraketu
 Lanka Satyam as the goatherd
 Mikkilineni as Mahendra
 K. V. S. Sharma as Dushtabudhi
 Padmanabham as one of Rupavathi's sons
 Balakrishna as Ati Telivi
 Rushyendramani as Gunavathi
 Hemalatha as the goatherd's wife
 Surabhi Balasarswathi as Adikaasa
 Chhaya Devi as Rupavathi

Production 
Gulebakavali Katha is the second Telugu film to be based on the folk tale Gulebakavali from the Arabian folk tale collection One Thousand and One Nights, following a 1938 film titled Gulebakavali. It was produced by N. Trivikrama Rao under National Art Theaters, and directed by N. T. Rama Rao. This was Rama Rao's second directorial venture after Sita Rama Kalyanam (1961); however, as with that film, he did not bill himself as director in the opening credits. The writer of the original story was not credited; instead, Trivikrama Rao was credited under "kathasekarana" (collecting the story). In addition to directing, Rama Rao starred as the male lead Vijay. He cast two female leads: Jamuna as the trickster dice player Yuktimati; and actress G. Varalakshmi's niece Nagarathna as princess Bakavali, this being her acting debut. Nagarathna had only two dialogues, one of which was "Nanna". Ravikant Nagaich was hired as cinematographer, K. Narasimha Rao for art direction, and S. P. S. Veerappa and G. Siva Murthy for editing.

Soundtrack 
Music composers Joseph and Vijaya Krishna Murthy made their debut with this film, as did lyricist C. Narayana Reddy. The film's most popular songs were "Nannu Dhochukonduvate", "Kalala Alalapai", "Unnadi Chebuta" and "Madana Sundara Naa Doraa".

Release and reception 
Gulebakavali Katha was released on 5 January 1962. The film was commercially successful, and contributed to Rama Rao's streak of successful films.

References

External links 
 

1960s fantasy adventure films
1960s Telugu-language films
1962 films
Films about royalty
Films based on One Thousand and One Nights
Films directed by N. T. Rama Rao
Indian black-and-white films
Indian fantasy adventure films
Indian swashbuckler films
Polygamy in fiction